Grant is an English given name derived from the French grand meaning 'tall' or 'large'. It was originally a nickname given to those with remarkable size.

Notable people with the given name "Grant" include

A
Grant Achatz (born 1974), American restaurateur
Grant Achilles (born 1986), American baseball coach
Grant Adam (born 1991), Scottish footballer
Grant Adamson, Australian rugby league footballer
Grant Adcox (1950–1989), American race car driver
Grant Albrecht (born 1981), Canadian luger
Grant D. Aldonas, American attorney
Grant Aleksander (born 1960), American actor
Grant Allen (1848–1899), Canadian writer
Grant Allen (cyclist) (born 1980), Australian Paralympic cyclist
Grant Allford (born 1950), Australian rules footballer
Grant Anderson (disambiguation), multiple people
Grant Atkins (born 1982), Australian rugby league referee

B
Grant Baker (born 1973), South African surfer
Grant Balfour (born 1977), Australian baseball player
Grant Barlow (born 1980), Australian footballer
Grant Barrett (born 1970), American lexicographer
Grant Bartholomaeus (born 1968), Australian rules footballer
Grant Basey (born 1988), English-Welsh footballer
Grant Batty (born 1951), New Zealand rugby union footballer
Grant Baze (1943–2009), American bridge player
Grant Bell, Australian rugby league football coach
Grant Besse (born 1994), American ice hockey player
Grant Billmeier (born 1984), American basketball player
Grant Birchall (born 1988), Australian rules footballer
Grant Blackwood (born 1964), American writer
Grant Blair (born 1964), Canadian ice hockey player
Grant Bluett, Australian orienteer
Grant Bond (born 1974), American comic book artist
Grant Bovey (born 1961), British businessman
Grant Bowler (born 1968), New Zealand-Australian actor
Grant Bowler (baseball) (1907–1968), American baseball player
Grant Boxall (born 1976), Australian Paralympic rugby footballer
Grant Boyce (born 1956), Australian field hockey player
Grant Bradburn (born 1966), New Zealand cricketer
Grant Bramwell (born 1961), New Zealand canoeist
Grant Brebner (born 1977), Scottish-Australian footballer
Grant Brisbee (born 1977), American writer
Grant Bristow (born 1958), Canadian intelligence officer
Grant Brits (born 1987), South African-Australian swimmer
Grant Brown (born 1969), English footballer
Grant Buchanan, New Zealand Paralympic athlete
Grant Buist (born 1973), New Zealand cartoonist
Grant Burgess (born 1960), English lawn bowler
Grant Burgoyne (born 1953), American politician

C
Grant Calcaterra (born 1998), American football player
Grant Campbell (disambiguation), multiple people
Grant Carpenter (1865–1936), American attorney
Grant Carter (born 1970), American football player
Grant Cashmore (born 1968), New Zealand equestrian
Grant Catalino, American lacrosse player
Grant Celliers (born 1978), South African cricketer
Grant Chalmers (born 1969), English footballer
Grant Chapman (born 1949), Australian politician
Grant Clarke (1891–1931), American songwriter
Grant Clitsome (born 1985), Canadian ice hockey player
Grant Cogswell (born 1967), American screenwriter
Grant Colburn (born 1966), American composer
Grant Collins, Australian drummer
Grant Conard (1867–1919), American politician
Grant Connell (born 1965), Canadian tennis player
Grant Connors (born 1973), Canadian weightlifter
Grant Cooper (1903–1990), American attorney
Grant Cornwell, American academic administrator
Grant Crabtree (1913–2008), Canadian cinematographer
Grant Crack (born 1963), Canadian politician
Grant Cramer (born 1961), American actor
Grant Cremer (born 1978), Australian runner

D
Grant Dalton (born 1957), New Zealand sailor
Grant Davies (born 1963), Australian canoeist
Grant Davies (footballer) (born 1959), English footballer
Grant Dawson (born 1994), American mixed martial artist
Grant Dayton (born 1987), American baseball player
Grant Deachman (1913–1983), Canadian politician
Grant Decker (1814–1890), American politician
Grant Delpit (born 1998), American football player
Grant Denyer (born 1977), Australian television presenter
Grant DePorter (born 1964), American restaurateur
Grant Desme (born 1986), American baseball player
Grant Devine (born 1944), Canadian politician
Grant Dexter (1896–1961), Canadian journalist
Grant Dezura (born 1973), Canadian curler
Grant Dibden (born 1961), Australian bishop
Grant Dibert, American football player
Grant Dodwell (born 1952), Australian actor
Grant Donaldson (born 1976), New Zealand cricketer
Grant Doorey (born 1968), Australian rugby league footballer
Grant Dorrington (born 1948), Australian rules footballer
Grant Doyle (disambiguation), multiple people
Grant Drumheller, American painter
Grant Dugmore (born 1967), South African cricketer
Grant Dunlap (1923–2014), American baseball and basketball player
Grant Duwe, American criminologist

E
Grant Easterbrook, American entrepreneur
Grant Edmeades (born 1992), South African cricketer
Grant Edwards, Australian weightlifter
Grant Elliott (born 1979), New Zealand cricketer
Grant Enfinger (born 1985), American stock car racing driver
Grant Erickson (born 1947), Canadian ice hockey player
Grant Esau (born 1998), South African cricketer
Grant Esterhuizen (born 1976), South African rugby union footballer
Grant Evans (disambiguation), multiple people

F
Grant Farred, South African professor
Grant Faulkner, American writer
Grant Featherston (1922–1995), Australian furniture designer
Grant Fellows (1865–1929), American jurist
Grant Fisher (born 1997), Canadian-American runner
Grant U. Fisher (1865–1931), American politician
Grant Fitzpatrick (born 1976), Australian Paralympic swimmer
Grant Fitzpatrick (musician), Australian musician
Grant Flower (born 1970), Zimbabwean cricketer
Grant Forrest (born 1993), Scottish golfer
Grant Forster (born 1961), English cricketer
Grant Foster (born 1945), Australian composer
Grant Fowler (born 1957), Australian rules footballer
Grant Fox (born 1962), New Zealand rugby union footballer
Grant Frame (born 1950), Canadian-American professor
Grant Freckelton, American visual effects artist
Grant Fuhr (born 1962), Canadian ice hockey player
Grant Furlong (1886–1973), American physician and politician

G
Grant O. Gale (1903–1998), American professor
Grant Gallagher (born 1991), Scottish footballer
Grant Garvey (born 1996), Australian rugby league footballer
Grant Gee (born 1964), British filmmaker
Grant Geissman (born 1953), American guitarist
Grant George, American voice actor
Grant Gershon (born 1960), American conductor
Grant Gibbs (born 1964), American soccer player
Grant Gibbs (basketball) (born 1989), American basketball coach
Grant Gibson (born 1948), New Zealand cricketer
Grant Gilchrist (born 1990), Scottish rugby union footballer
Grant Gillespie (disambiguation), multiple people
Grant Gillis (1901–1981), American baseball player
Grant Gillon, New Zealand politician
Grant Gilmore (born 2013), Meteorologist
Grant Ginder (born 1983), American author
Grant Goegan (born 1955), Italian ice hockey player
Grant Golden (tennis) (1929–2018), American tennis player
Grant Golden (basketball) (born 1998), American basketball player
Grant Golding (born 1981), Canadian gymnast
Grant Goldman (1950–2020), Australian television presenter
Grant Goldschmidt (born 1983), South African volleyball player
Grant Gondrezick (1963–2021), American basketball player
Grant Goodeve (born 1952), American actor
Grant Gordon (1900–1954), Canadian ice hockey player
Grant Gore (born 1991), English rugby league footballer
Grant Gregory (born 1986), American football player
Grant Green (disambiguation), multiple people
Grant Greenham (1954–2018), Australian archer
Grant Guilford, New Zealand-American academic
Grant Gunnell (born 1999), American football player
Grant Gustin (born 1990), American actor
Grant Guthrie (born 1948), American football player

H
Grant Hackett (born 1980), Australian swimmer
Grant Hadwin (born 1949), Canadian forest engineer
Grant J. Hagiya (born 1952), American bishop
Grant Haley (born 1979), English footballer
Grant Haley (American football) (born 1996), American football player
Grant Hall (born 1991), English footballer
Grant E. Hamilton (1862–1926), American political cartoonist
Grant Hammond (1944–2019), New Zealand jurist
Grant Hampton (born 2003), American soccer player
Grant Hanley (born 1991), Scottish footballer
Grant Hansen, Australian politician
Grant Hansen (rugby union), New Zealand rugby union coach
Grant Harrold (born 1978), British etiquette expert
Grant Hart (1961–2017), American musician
Grant Harvey (born 1984), American actor
Grant Haskin (born 1968), South African politician
Grant Hattingh (born 1990), South African rugby union footballer
Grant Hauschild, American politician
Grant Hayunga (born 1970), American painter
Grant Heard (born 1978), American football coach
Grant Heckenlively (1916–1985), American football player
Grant Hedger, Australian rugby league footballer
Grant Hedrick (born 1991), American football player
Grant Heffernan, Canadian ice hockey player
Grant Henry (born 1956), American businessman
Grant Hermanns (born 1998), American football player
Grant Hermanus (born 1995), South African rugby union footballer
Grant Heslov (born 1963), American actor
Grant Hildebrand (born 1934), American architect
Grant Hill (disambiguation), multiple people
Grant Hillary (born 1969), South African rower
Grant Hochstein (born 1990), American figure skater
Grant Hodges, American politician
Grant Hodgins (born 1955), Canadian politician
Grant Hodnett (born 1982), South African-English cricketer
Grant Holloway (born 1997), American hurdler
Grant Holmes (born 1996), American baseball player
Grant Holt (born 1981), English footballer
Grant Horscroft (born 1961), English footballer
Grant Horsfield, South African entrepreneur
Grant Horton (born 2001), English footballer
Grant Howell (born 1984), South African cricketer
Grant Hunter (born 1967), Canadian politician
Grant Huscroft, Canadian jurist
Grant Hutchison (born 1984), Scottish drummer
Grant Hutton (born 1995), American ice hockey player

I
Grant Imahara (1970–2020), American engineer and television personality
Grant Irons (born 1979), American football player
Grant Irvine (born 1991), Australian swimmer
Grant Izzard (born 1970), Australian rugby league footballer

J
Grant Jackson (disambiguation), multiple people
Grant James (born 1987), American rower
Grant Janke (born 1990), South African rugby union player
Grant C. Jaquith, American judge
Grant Jeffrey (1948–2012), Canadian preacher
Grant Jennings (born 1965), American ice hockey player
Grant Jerrett (born 1993), American basketball player
Grant Johannesen (1921–2005), American pianist
Grant Johnson (disambiguation), multiple people
Grant Jones (1938–2021), American landscape architect
Grant Jones (rugby league) (born 1958), Australian rugby league footballer
Grant Jordan (born 1965), Australian cricketer

K
Grant Kekana (born 1992), South African footballer
Grant Kemp (born 1988), South African-Hong Kong rugby union footballer
Grant Kenny (born 1963), Australian canoeist
Grant Kereama (born 1967), New Zealand radio host
Grant Kerr (born 1985), Scottish footballer
Grant King, Australian engineer
Grant Kirkhope (born 1962), British composer
Grant Kitchings (1938–2005), American singer
Grant Koontz (born 1994), American cyclist
Grant Knox (born 1960), Scottish lawn bowler
Grant Kraemer (born 1996), American football player
Grant Krieger, Canadian activist

L
Grant Lambert (born 1977), Australian cricketer
Grant Langley, American attorney
Grant Langston (disambiguation), multiple people
Grant Larson (1933–2020), American politician
Grant Lauchlan, Scottish journalist
Grant Lavigne (born 1999), American baseball player
Grant Lawrence (born 1971), Canadian broadcaster
Grant Lawrie (born 1958), Australian rules footballer
Grant Leadbitter (born 1986), English footballer
Grant Ledyard (born 1961), Canadian ice hockey player
Grant Leep, American basketball coach
Grant Leitch (born 1972), South African footballer
Grant LeMarquand (born 1955), Canadian bishop
Grant Leury (born 1967), Australian canoeist
Grant Lewi (1902–1951), American astrologer
Grant Lewis (born 1985), American ice hockey player
Grant Liddle (1921–1989), American endocrinologist
Grant Lightbown, New Zealand footballer
Grant Lillard (born 1995), American soccer player
Grant Lindsay (born 1979), Australian cricketer
Grant Lingard (1961–1995), New Zealand artist
Grant Llewellyn (born 1960), Welsh conductor
Grant Logan (born 1980), Scottish lawn bowler
Grant Long (born 1966), American basketball player
Grant Long (cricketer) (born 1961), South African cricketer
Grant Loretz, New Zealand sailor
Grant Lyons (born 1941), American writer

M
Grant Macaskill, Scottish scholar
Grant MacEwan (1902–2000), Canadian farmer and professor
Grant Main (born 1960), Canadian rower
Grant Major (born 1955), New Zealand art director
Grant Manzoney (born 1969), Australian Paralympic badminton player
Grant Margeman (born 1998), South African footballer
Grant Marsh (1834–1916), American riverboat captain
Grant Marshall (born 1973), Canadian ice hockey player
Grant Martin (born 1962), Canadian ice hockey player
Grant Martin (cricketer) (born 1999), South African cricketer
Grant Mason (born 1983), American football player
Grant Mattos (born 1981), American football player
Grant McAuley (born 1949), New Zealand rower
Grant McBride (1949–2018), Australian politician
Grant McCann (born 1980), Northern Irish football manager
Grant McCasland (born 1976), American basketball coach
Grant McConachie (1909–1965), Canadian pilot
Grant McCracken (born 1951), Canadian anthropologist
Grant McCune (1943–2010), American special effects designer
Grant McDonald (baseball) (born 1973), Australian baseball player
Grant McDonald (Canadian football) (born 1999), Canadian American football player
Grant McDougall (1910–1958), American athlete
Grant McEachran (1894–1966), English footballer
Grant McKee (born 1940), Canadian footballer player
Grant McKelvey (born 1968), Scottish rugby union manager
Grant McKenzie (born 1961), New Zealand cricketer
Grant McLaren (born 1948), Canadian runner
Grant McLean (1921–2002), Canadian film director
Grant McLennan (1958–2006), Australian singer-songwriter
Grant McLeod (born 1959), New Zealand field hockey player
Grant McMartin (born 1970), Scottish footballer
Grant McPherson (born 1964/1965), Scottish curler
Grant Michaels (1947–2009), American writer
Grant Miehm, Canadian illustrator
Grant Millington (born 1986), Australian rugby league footballer
Grant Mitchell (disambiguation), multiple people
Grant Mitton (disambiguation), multiple people
Grant Mizens (born 1977), Australian wheelchair basketball player
Grant Mokoena (born 1987), South African cricketer
Grant Morgan (disambiguation), multiple people
Grant Morrison (born 1960), Scottish comic book writer
Grant Morrow (born 1970), Scottish footballer
Grant Morton (1857–1920), American skydiver
Grant Mossop (1948–2005), Canadian geologist
Grant E. Mouser Jr. (1895–1943), American politician
Grant Mudford (born 1944), Australian photographer
Grant R. Mulder, American general
Grant Muller (born 1970), South African golfer
Grant Mulvey (born 1956), Canadian ice hockey player
Grant Munro (disambiguation), multiple people
Grant Murray (born 1975), Scottish footballer
Grant Musgrove (born 1968), Australian politician

N
Grant Napear (born 1959), American sportscaster
Grant Needham (born 1970), Canadian footballer
Grant Nel (born 1988), Australian diver
Grant Nelson (disambiguation), multiple people
Grant Nicholas (born 1967), Welsh musician
Grant Nicholson (born 1994), English entrepreneur
Grant Nisbett (born 1950), New Zealand broadcaster
Grant Noel (born 1980), American football player
Grant Notley (1939–1984), Canadian politician

O
Grant Odishaw (born 1964), Canadian curler
Grant Olney (born 1983), American singer-songwriter
Grant Oppy (born 1950), Australian rules footballer
Grant Orchard, British animator
Grant O'Riley (born 1960), Australian rules footballer
Grant R. Osborne (1942–2018), American theologian
Grant Martin Overton (1887–1930), American writer

P
Grant Page (born 1939), Australian stuntman
Grant Palmer (disambiguation), multiple people
Grant Parker (born 1967), South African professor
Grant Parker (wrestler) (born 1960), New Zealand wrestler
Grant Patterson (born 1989), Australian Paralympic swimmer
Grant Perry (born 1953), New Zealand rugby union footballer
Grant Petersen, American bicycle designer
Grant Piro, Australian actor
Grant Pointer (born 1982), English rugby union footballer
Grant Potter, American cyclist
Grant Potulny (born 1980), American ice hockey player

Q
Grant Quinlan (born 1998), Canadian stock car racing driver

R
Grant Reibel (born 1980), Australian rugby league footballer
Grant Reuber (1927–2018), Canadian economist
Grant Reynard (1887–1968), American painter
Grant Rice (born 1968), Australian cyclist
Grant A. Rice, American theatrical producer
Grant Richards (disambiguation), multiple people
Grant Richison (born 1967), American ice hockey player
Grant Riller (born 1997), American basketball player
Grant Rix (born 1965), Australian rugby league footballer
Grant Roberts (born 1977), American baseball player
Grant L. Roberts, Canadian bodybuilder
Grant Robertson (born 1971), New Zealand politician
Grant Robicheaux, American surgeon
Grant Robins (born 1969), English swimmer
Grant Robinson (disambiguation), multiple people
Grant Robison (born 1978), American runner
Grant Roden (born 1980), Australian cricketer
Grant Roelofsen (born 1996), South African cricketer
Grant Rohach (born 1994), American football player
Grant Rosenberg, American novelist
Grant Rosenmeyer (born 1991), American actor
Grant Rovelli (born 1983), Australian rugby league footballer
Grant Russ, Filipino cricketer
Grant Russell, American football player

S
Grant Saacks, South African tennis player
Grant Sabatier (born 1984), American author
Grant Sampson (born 1982), South African darts player
Grant Sasser (born 1964), American ice hockey player
Grant Sawyer (1918–1996), American politician
Grant B. Schley (1845–1917), American financier
Grant Schmidt (born 1948), Canadian politician
Grant Schofield, New Zealand footballer
Grant Schreiber (born 1967), South African publisher
Grant Schubert (born 1980), Australian hockey player
Grant Scicluna (born 1980), Australian film director
Grant Serpell (born 1944), British musician
Grant Shapps (born 1968), British politician
Grant Sharman, New Zealand Paralympic rugby player
Grant Shaud (born 1960), American actor
Grant Shaw (born 1984), Canadian football player
Grant Sheehan, New Zealand photographer
Grant Sheen (born 1974), English cricketer
Grant Sheppard (born 1972), English cricketer
Grant Sherfield (born 1999), American basketball player
Grant Shiells (born 1989), Scottish rugby union footballer
Grant Short Bull (1851–1935), American chief
Grant Show (born 1962), American actor
Grant Showerman (1870–1935), American scholar
Grant Silcock (born 1975), Australian tennis player
Grant Simmer (born 1957), Australian sailor
Grant Simmons (disambiguation), multiple people
Grant Singer (born 1985), American music director
Grant C. Sisson (1885–1956), American politician
Grant Sitton (born 1993), American basketball player
Grant Smillie (born 1977), Australian music producer
Grant Smith (disambiguation), multiple people
Grant Solomon (born 1995), American tennis player
Grant Sonnex, British furniture designer
Grant Sorensen (born 1982), Australian volleyball player
Grant Stafford (born 1971), South African tennis player
Grant Standbrook (born 1937), Canadian ice hockey player
Grant Starrett, American real estate developer
Grant Stauffer (1888–1949), American railroad executive
Grant Stevens (disambiguation), multiple people
Grant Stevenson (born 1981), Canadian ice hockey player
Grant Stewart (disambiguation), multiple people
Grant Stinnett, American bassist
Grant Stockdale (1915–1963), American businessman and diplomat
Grant Stoelwinder, Australian swimming coach
Grant Stone, Australian librarian
Grant Stoneman (born 1995), American soccer player
Grant Stott (born 1967), Scottish broadcaster
Grant Strate (1927–2015), Canadian dancer
Grant Stuard (born 1997), American football player
Grant Stuart (born 1975), Australian rugby league footballer
Grant Sullivan (disambiguation), multiple people
Grant Supaphongs (born 1976), Thai racing driver
Grant Robert Sutherland (born 1945), Australian geneticist

T
Grant Tambling (born 1943), Australian politician
Grant Tanner (born 1970), Australian rules footballer
Grant Taylor (disambiguation), multiple people
Grant Thatcher (1877–1936), American baseball player
Grant Thomas (disambiguation), multiple people
Grant Thomson (born 1988), South African cricketer
Grant Thornton (cricketer) (born 1992), English cricketer
Grant Thorogood, Australian rugby league footballer
Grant Tierney (born 1961), Scottish footballer
Grant Tilly (1937–2012), New Zealand actor
Grant F. Timmerman (1919–1944), American marine
Grant Tinker (1926–2016), American television executive
Grant Hendrik Tonne (born 1976), German politician
Grant Tregoning (born 1988), New Zealand racing driver
Grant Tremblay (born 1984), American astrophysicist
Grant Trindall, Australian rugby league footballer
Grant Tullar (1869–1950), American minister
Grant Turner (disambiguation), multiple people

U
Grant Underwood, American historian

V
Grant Van De Casteele (born 1991), American soccer player
Grant van Heerden (born 1969), South African cricketer
Grant Venerable, American professor

W
Grant Wacker (born 1945), American historian
Grant Wahl (1974–2022), American journalist
Grant Waite (born 1964), New Zealand golfer
Grant Wallace (1867–1954), American journalist
Grant Ward (born 1994), English footballer
Grant Waterman (born 1971), Australian water polo player
Grant Watson (1905–1977), Canadian curler
Grant Watts (born 1973), English footballer
Grant Weatherstone (1931–2020), Scottish rugby union footballer
Grant Webb (born 1979), New Zealand rugby union footballer
Grant Wells (born 2002), American football player
Grant Wheelhouse, Australian rugby league footballer
Grant Whitmore (born 1956), Canadian politician
Grant Whytock (1894–1981), American film editor
Grant Wiley, American football player
Grant Wilkinson (born 1974), British gunsmith
Grant Williams (disambiguation), multiple people
Grant Wilmot (1956–2016), Australian rules footballer
Grant Wilson (born 1974), American art director
Grant M. Wilson (1931–2012), American thermodynamicist
Grant Wistrom (born 1976), American football player
Grant Withers (1905–1959), American actor
Grant Wood (1891–1942), American painter
Grant Woodhams (born 1952), Australian politician
Grant Woods (1954–2021), American attorney and politician

Y
Grant David Yeats (1773–1836), English-American physician
Grant Young (disambiguation), multiple people

Fictional characters
Grant Ward (Marvel Cinematic Universe), a character in the Marvel Cinematic Universe

References

English masculine given names